The Department of the Taoiseach is the government department of the Taoiseach, the title in Ireland for the head of government. It is based in Government Buildings, the headquarters of the Government of Ireland, on Merrion Street in Dublin.

The civil servant who heads the Department of the Taoiseach is known as the Secretary General of the Department and also serves as the Cabinet Secretary.

Departmental team
Taoiseach: Leo Varadkar, TD
Government Chief Whip: Hildegarde Naughton, TD 
Minister of State for European Affairs: Peter Burke, TD
Secretary General of the Department: John Callinan

Functions

The main role of the Department is to support and advise the Taoiseach in carrying out various duties. The Department also supplies administrative support to the Government Chief Whip in respect of his duties and provides the Secretariat to the Government. The Department has a pivotal role in acting as a link between the President, the Taoiseach and other Departments of State.

In addition, the Department of the Taoiseach is involved in a number of other areas such as the development and co-ordination of policy in relation to economic and social development (Social Partnership), Northern Ireland, the European Union and Oireachtas reform. It also arranges State functions such as the annual National Day of Commemoration, Presidential inaugurations, State dinners and provides a protocol service to the Taoiseach of the day.

History
Article 53 of the Constitution of the Irish Free State created the position of President of the Executive Council of the Irish Free State. The Department was created by the Ministers and Secretaries Act 1924 as the Department of the President of the Executive Council, which came into operation on 2 June 1924. Under that act it was assigned:

The position of Taoiseach was created under Articles 13.1 and 28.5 of the Constitution of Ireland, which was approved on 1 July 1937. Under the Constitution (Consequential Provisions) Act 1937, the Department of the President of the Executive Council was renamed as the Department of the Taoiseach from and after the coming into operation of the Constitution of Ireland, which occurred on 29 December 1937.

References

External links

 
Politics of the Republic of Ireland
Taoiseach
Ministries established in 1937
1937 establishments in Ireland